Season 1995–96

League season

Results

Final table

Scottish League Cup

Results

Scottish Cup

Results

See also
List of Hibernian F.C. seasons

References

External links
Hibernian 1996/1997 results and fixtures, Soccerbase

Hibernian F.C. seasons
Hibernian